Bullville is a populated place located in the Town of Crawford in Orange County, New York, United States. It is located at the junction of routes NY-17K and NY-302. Bulville is the site of a United States Post Office and is served by the postal code 10915.

Bullville was one of the original four important settlements in the Town of Crawford.

References

External links
NYHometownlocator - Bullville (Map)

Hamlets in Orange County, New York
Poughkeepsie–Newburgh–Middletown metropolitan area